Koira is a Town, Block and tahsil  in Sundargarh District, Odisha, India.

Geography

Koira has abundant deposits of iron ore and manganese ore and many mines operate in the area.

The majority of the population in the town are settled migrants from Khordha, Cuttack, Jajpur, Bhadrak, Uttar Pradesh, Bihar and West Bengal. Dust from the various mining activities is a problem in the town, but precautions have been taken by mining corporations and local authorities to reduce and eradicate the dust.

References

External links
 Satellite map of Koira

Cities and towns in Sundergarh district